Mecodema haunoho is the only ground beetle (Carabidae) species that is endemic to Little Barrier Island (Hauturu). It is sister species the Great Barrier Island (Aotea) species M. aoteanoho and both are closely related to M. manaia, a species found in Bream Head, Northland, New Zealand.

Diagnosis 
Distinguished from other North Island Mecodema species by having:

 the prothoracic carina narrow the entire length, moderately crenulated with 3 setae along each side (curvidens species group); 
 distinctive shape of the penis lobe.

Description 
Length 20.5–24.1 mm, pronotal width 5.1–5.9 mm, elytral width 6.3–6.8 mm. Colour of entire body matte to glossy black.

Natural history 
Found throughout the island, but more commonly encountered in the broadleaf forests of the southern and southwestern areas of Hauturu.

References

haunoho
Beetles of New Zealand
Beetles described in 2011